Ehrensvärd is the name of a Swedish noble family and may refer to:

Johan Jacob Ehrensvärd (1666–1731), Swedish colonel
Augustin Ehrensvärd (1710–1772), Swedish military architect, a lieutenant colonel in the artillery
Carl August Ehrensvärd (1745–1800), Swedish naval officer, painter, author, and neo-classical architect
Carl Ehrensvärd (1713–1770), Swedish politician
Gustaf Johan Ehrensvärd (1746–1783), Swedish writer. Brother of Carl August Ehrensvärd and half brother to Carl Fredrik Ehrensvärd
Carl August Ehrensvärd (1749–1805), Swedish general and diplomat
Carl Fredrik Ehrensvärd (1767–1815), Swedish Freiherr, convicted of involvement in the murder of Gustav III in 1792 and sentenced to death. Married to Thomasine Christine Gyllembourg-Ehrensvärd (1773–1856), Danish author, born in Copenhagen.
Gustaf Karl Albert August Ehrensvärd (1787–1860), Swedish colonel
Albert Ehrensvärd (1821–1901), Swedish politician
Albert Ehrensvärd (1867–1940), Swedish diplomat
Carl August Ehrensvärd (1858–1944), Swedish admiral, politician and sea minister 1907–1911
Gösta Ehrensvärd (1885–1973), Swedish admiral
Gösta Ehrensvärd (1910–1980), Swedish chemist
Augustin Ehrensvärd (1887–1968), Swedish civil servant
Carl August Ehrensvärd (1892–1974), Swedish general